November 2 - Eastern Orthodox liturgical calendar - November 4

All fixed commemorations below celebrated on November 16 by Eastern Orthodox Churches on the Old Calendar.

For November 3rd, Orthodox Churches on the Old Calendar commemorate the Saints listed on October 21.

Saints
 Martyrs Dassios, Severus, Andronas, Theodotus and Theodoti, by the sword.
 Martyrs Atticus, Agapius, Eudoxius, Carterius, Istucarius (Styrax), Pactobius (Tobias), Nictopolion, and companions, at Sebaste (320)  (see also: November 2 )
 The Holy 9 Martyrs, by the sword.
 The Holy 28 Martyrs, by fire.
 Hieromartyrs Acepsimas of Hnaita, Bishop (376), Joseph the Presbyter (377), and Aeithalas the Deacon (377), of Persia.
 Saint Snandulia of Persia (380)
 Saint Achaemonides (or Hormisdas), Confessor, of Persia (4th century)
 Venerable Acepsimas, hermit, of Cyrrhus in Syria (4th century)
 Venerable Elias of Egypt.
 Saint Theodore the Confessor, Bishop of Ancyra (8th-9th century)

Pre-Schism Western saints
 Saint Papulus (Papoul), a priest who worked with St Saturninus in France and like him was martyred under Diocletian (c. 300)
 The Innumerable Martyrs of Saragossa (304)
 Saint Valentine and Hilary, a priest and his deacon, beheaded at Viterbo near Rome under Diocletian (c. 304)
 Saint Florus of Lodève (Flour), first Bishop of Lodève in Languedoc in France (389)
 Saint Valentinian, Bishop of Salerno in the south of Italy (c. 500)
 Saint Gwenhael, born in Brittany, he became a monk at Landévennec Abbey with St Winwalöe, where he later became abbot (c. 550)
 Saint Sylvia, the mother of St Gregory the Great (c. 572)  (see also: November 4)
 Saint Gaudiosus of Tarazona, a monk in Asan in the Pyrenees in Spain under St Victorian, later the Bishop of Tarazona (c. 585)
 Saint Clether (Clydawg, Cledog, Clodock), a hermit in Herefordshire (6th century)
 Saint Elerius, Abbot of a monastery in North Wales (6th century)
 Saint Winifred of Holywell (Winifred of Treffynon), Wales (630)
 Saint Domnus of Vienne (Domnolus), Bishop of Vienne, Confessor (657)
 Saint Rumwold of Buckingham (Rumwald of Brackley), infant Prince of Northumbria (662)
 Saint Cristiolus, brother of St Sulian and founder of churches, including one in Anglesey in Wales (7th century)
 Saint Vulganius, a Celt who went to France and enlightened the Atrebati, finally living as a hermit in Arras (c. 704)
 Saint Hubert, Bishop of Liege (727)
 Saint Pirmin, Bishop and monastic founder in Germany (753)
 Saint Wulgan, a holy man born in Canterbury in England, where his relics were later venerated (8th century)
 Saints Acheric and William, hermits at a monastery in the Vosges in France (c. 860)
 Saint Englatius (Englat, Tanglen), possibly a bishop, he lived in Tarves in Aberdeenshire in Scotland (966)
 Saint Hermengaudius (Ermengol, Armengol), Bishop of Urgell in Spain (1035)

Post-Schism Orthodox saints
 Saint Anna Vsevolodovna of Kiev, Princess, daughter of Prince Vsevolod I of Kiev (1112)<ref>  Οσία Άννα του Κιέβου. Ορθόδοξος Συναξαριστής.</ref>
 Saint Nicholas of Iveron (Mt. Athos) and Georgia, hymnographer (1308)Venerable Nicholas, Radiant Star of the Georgians. OCA - Lives of the Saints.
 New Hieromartyr George, priest, of Neopolis, Asia Minor (1797)

New martyrs and confessors
 New Hieromartyr Nicholas Dinariev, Presbyter (1918) 16 ноября (3 ноября). Православная Энциклопедия под редакцией Патриарха Московского и всея Руси Кирилла (электронная версия). (Orthodox Encyclopedia - Pravenc.ru). 
 New Martyr Paul Parfenov (1918)
 New Hieromartyrs (1937): 
 Basil Archangelsky; Peter Orlenkov; Basil Pokrovsky; Alexander Zverev; Vladimir Pisarev; Sergius Kedrov; Nicholas Pyatnitsky; Vicentius Smirnov; John Kesarisky; Peter Kosmenkov; Alexander Parusnikov; Paul Andreev; and Cosmas Petrychenko, Priests;
 Simeon Krechkov, Deacon.
 Virgin-martyr Evdokia Safronova (1938) ЕВДОКИЯ. Православная Энциклопедия под редакцией Патриарха Московского и всея Руси Кирилла (электронная версия). (Orthodox Encyclopedia - Pravenc.ru).
 New Hieromartyr Sergius Stanislavlev, Deacon (1942)

Other commemorations
 Translation of the holy relics of the Holy Great Martyr George the Trophy-bearer, and Dedication of the Church of the Great-martyr George in Lydda (4th century)Great Synaxaristes:  Ἀνακομιδὴ Τιμίων Λειψάνων Ἁγίου Γεωργίου τοῦ Μεγαλομάρτυρα καὶ Τροπαιοφόρου καὶ ἐγκαίνια Ναοῦ του στὴν Λύδδα τῆς Ἰόππης. 3 Νοεμβρίου. ΜΕΓΑΣ ΣΥΝΑΞΑΡΙΣΤΗΣ.Dedication of the Church of the Greatmartyr George in Lydia. OCA - Lives of the Saints.
 Translation of the holy relics of St. Edith of Wilton, English nun.
 Translation of the holy relics (1796) of the New Great-martyr Apostolos (1686) from Constantinople to Agios Lavrentios in Pelion, Thessaly.Great Synaxaristes:  Μετακομιδὴ Τιμίων Λειψάνων Ἁγίου Μεγαλομάρτυρα Ἀποστόλου τοῦ νέου. 3 Νοεμβρίου. ΜΕΓΑΣ ΣΥΝΑΞΑΡΙΣΤΗΣ.
 Repose of Hieroschemamonk Daniil (Tudor) of Romania (1962)

Icon gallery

Notes

References

Sources
 November 3/November 16. Orthodox Calendar (PRAVOSLAVIE.RU).
 November 16 / November 3. HOLY TRINITY RUSSIAN ORTHODOX CHURCH (A parish of the Patriarchate of Moscow).
 November 3. OCA - The Lives of the Saints.
 The Autonomous Orthodox Metropolia of Western Europe and the Americas (ROCOR). St. Hilarion Calendar of Saints for the year of our Lord 2004. St. Hilarion Press (Austin, TX). p. 82.
 The Third Day of the Month of November. Orthodoxy in China.
 November 3. Latin Saints of the Orthodox Patriarchate of Rome.
 The Roman Martyrology. Transl. by the Archbishop of Baltimore. Last Edition, According to the Copy Printed at Rome in 1914. Revised Edition, with the Imprimatur of His Eminence Cardinal Gibbons. Baltimore: John Murphy Company, 1916. p. 339-340.
 Rev. Richard Stanton. A Menology of England and Wales, or, Brief Memorials of the Ancient British and English Saints Arranged According to the Calendar, Together with the Martyrs of the 16th and 17th Centuries. London: Burns & Oates, 1892. pp. 522–524.
Greek Sources
 Great Synaxaristes:  3 ΝΟΕΜΒΡΙΟΥ. ΜΕΓΑΣ ΣΥΝΑΞΑΡΙΣΤΗΣ.
  Συναξαριστής. 3 Νοεμβρίου. ECCLESIA.GR. (H ΕΚΚΛΗΣΙΑ ΤΗΣ ΕΛΛΑΔΟΣ).
  03/11/2015.'' Ορθόδοξος Συναξαριστής. 
Russian Sources
  16 ноября (3 ноября). Православная Энциклопедия под редакцией Патриарха Московского и всея Руси Кирилла (электронная версия). (Orthodox Encyclopedia - Pravenc.ru).
  3 ноября по старому стилю  /  16 ноября по новому стилю. Русская Православная Церковь - Православный церковный календарь на 2015 год.

November in the Eastern Orthodox calendar